Abdul Aziz Abdul Nabi (born 1970) is an Iraqi former international football player, who played for Iraq in the 2000 WAFF Championship.

References

1970 births
Living people
Al-Mina'a SC players
Association football wingers
Iraqi footballers
Iraq international footballers
Expatriate footballers in Yemen